Senator Carroll may refer to:

Members of the United States Senate
John A. Carroll (1901–1983), U.S. Senator from Colorado from 1957 to 1963
Charles Carroll of Carrollton (1737–1832), U.S. Senator from Maryland from 1789 to 1792

United States state senate members
Beryl F. Carroll (1860–1939), Iowa State Senate
Charles H. Carroll (1794–1865), New York State Senate
Charles Carroll (barrister) (1723–1783), Maryland State Senate
Daniel J. Carroll (1874–1927), New York State Senate
Daniel Carroll (1730–1796), Maryland State Senate
Danny Carroll (Kentucky politician) (born 1963), Kentucky State Senate
Edward C. Carroll (1893–1969), Massachusetts State Senate
Howard W. Carroll (born 1942), Illinois State Senate
James H. Carroll (c. 1876–1950), Wisconsin State Senate
John Lee Carroll (1830–1911), Maryland State Senate
John Carroll (Hawaii politician) (born 1929), Hawaii State Senate
Julian Carroll (born 1931), Kentucky State Senate
Morgan Carroll (born 1971), Colorado State Senate
William D. Carroll (1880–1955), Wisconsin State Senate

See also
Senator Carrell (disambiguation)